CCG Profiles is a software for designing joinery constructions for windows and doors industry.

History
The first version was released in 1995 – named Alumin, as a software for design and calculation of aluminium constructions for Windows. In 1999 the software was renamed Profiles and it was redesigned, in order to calculate PVC and timber constructions.

Reviews and awards
At the 62nd International Fair Plovdiv, 2006, the program CCG Profiles was awarded a golden medal.
Articles for the program were published in the Bulgarian magazine AMS Aspects and the Serbian one Aluminium & PVC magazin. 
According to an unofficial data, CCG Profiles is one of the most popular software for windows & doors industry in Bulgaria, and a large number of companies – manufacturers and suppliers of profile systems (Etem, Blick, Veka, Weiss Profil, Exalco, Profilink, Altest, Profilko, Roplasto) offer the software product to its customers.

References

External links 
 http://www.ccg-bg.com — Official site

Proprietary software